Sir Rabindrah Ghurburrun (Tamil: சர் இரவீந்திர குருபரன்) (1928–2008) was the first Vice President of Mauritius from 1992 to 1997. He started his political career as a member of the Mauritius Labour Party. However, he was appointed by the Mauritian Militant Movement-Militant Socialist Movement coalition government as vice president while the Labour Party was in the opposition.

A lawyer by profession, he did a diploma at the University of Oxford. He was also the first High Commissioner of Mauritius to India. Then Prime Minister Indira Gandhi described him as behaving like the last Maharaja of India

He died at the age of 79 in Paris.

References 

1928 births
2008 deaths
Mauritian Hindus
Mauritian people of Indian descent
Vice-presidents of Mauritius
20th-century Mauritian lawyers
Alumni of the University of Oxford
High Commissioners of Mauritius to India
Alumni of Keble College, Oxford
Grand Officers of the Order of the Star and Key of the Indian Ocean